Woda Number 6 is a 2015 Nepali film directed by Ujwal Ghimire. The film features an ensemble cast including Kedar Ghimire, Dayahang Rai, Deepa Shree Niraula, Deepak Raj Giri, Priyanka Karki, Jeetu Nepal, Sitaram Kattel, Neer Shah, Buddhi Tamang, Wilson Bikram Rai, and Shivahari Poudel in the lead roles.

Plot

Cast 

 Kedar Ghimire as Magne Budho
 Deepak Raj Giri as Deep Kumar Sharma
 Dayahang Rai as Daya
 Priyanka Karki as Sushila
 Jeetu Nepal as Birkhe
 Sitaram Kattel as Netra Prasad
 Deepa Shree Niraula as Pratigya
 Neer Shah as Kaji
 Buddhi Tamang as Buddhi
 Wilson Bikram Rai as Bidehsi
 Shivahari Poudel

Reception

Awards

References

External links 
 

Nepalese romantic comedy films
Films shot in Kathmandu
2010s Nepali-language films
2015 romantic comedy films
Nepalese Civil War films